Deerfield Township is a civil township of Livingston County in the U.S. state of Michigan. The population was 4,170 at the 2010 census.

Communities
Deerfield Center is an unincorporated community on Center and Mack roads .

Geography
Deerfield Township is in the northeast part of Livingston County and is bordered to the north by Genesee County. The township is drained by north-flowing tributaries of the Shiawassee River.

Demographics
As of the census of 2000, there were 4,087 people, 1,386 households, and 1,118 families residing in the township. The racial makeup of the township was 98.29% White, 0.51% Native American, 0.12% Asian, 0.10% from other races, and 0.98% from two or more races. Hispanic or Latino of any race were 1.25% of the population.

There were 1,386 households, out of which 41.0% had children under the age of 18 living with them, 71.9% were married couples living together, 5.6% had a female householder with no husband present, and 19.3% were non-families. 15.1% of all households were made up of individuals, and 3.7% had someone living alone who was 65 years of age or older.  The average household size was 2.95 and the average family size was 3.30.

In the township the population was spread out, with 29.9% under the age of 18, 6.3% from 18 to 24, 32.1% from 25 to 44, 25.2% from 45 to 64, and 6.5% who were 65 years of age or older.  The median age was 36 years. For every 100 females, there were 107.5 males.  For every 100 females age 18 and over, there were 108.7 males.

The median income for a household in the township was $65,756, and the median income for a family was $69,750. Males had a median income of $47,202 versus $34,028 for females. The per capita income for the township was $28,140.  About 1.3% of families and 2.4% of the population were below the poverty line, including 3.3% of those under age 18 and 4.1% of those age 65 or over.

References

External links
Deerfield Township official website

Townships in Livingston County, Michigan
Townships in Michigan